Moussa Diarra (born 4 February 1990) is a French professional footballer who plays as a centre-back for Barnet.

Career
Diarra was born in Élancourt and played for clubs in his home town, and in Montigny-le-Bretonneux, before moving to England in 2011. He had a trial with Tooting & Mitcham United before joining Horley Town in October 2011. In February 2012, he joined St Albans City, before signing for Hemel Hempstead Town in January 2013. After two loan spells with Hampton & Richmond Borough in the 2014-15 season, Diarra joined the Beavers permanently in July 2015. After one season, he became a full-time player after joining Barrow in summer 2016. He joined Dover Athletic for the 2018-19 season as he wanted to live closer to France, but struggled to break into the team as he recovered from a pulled hamstring and joined Woking on loan until the end of the season, when the move was made permanent. Diarra turned down a new contract offer from the Cards at the end of the season and joined Havant & Waterlooville. However, he re-joined Woking on a permanent basis after the National League South season was curtailed due to the ongoing coronavirus pandemic. Diarra signed for Barnet ahead of the 2021-22 season.

Career statistics

References

1990 births
Living people
French footballers
French sportspeople of Malian descent
Black French sportspeople
Horley Town F.C. players
St Albans City F.C. players
Hemel Hempstead Town F.C. players
Hampton & Richmond Borough F.C. players
Barrow A.F.C. players
Dover Athletic F.C. players
Woking F.C. players
Havant & Waterlooville F.C. players
Barnet F.C. players
National League (English football) players
Southern Football League players
Isthmian League players
Association football defenders
French expatriate footballers
French expatriate sportspeople in England
Expatriate footballers in England